The Battle of Karbala was fought in 680 CE

Battle of Karbala may also refer to:

 Battle of Karbala (1991), during the 1991 uprisings in Iraq
 Battle of Karbala (2003), during the 2003 invasion of Iraq
 Defense of Karbala City Hall, during the Iraq spring fighting of 2004
 Battle of Karbala (2007), during the Iraq War